Kalwas is a large village located in Churu district, Rajasthan, India and situated on the road between Taranagar and Sahawa.

Villages in Churu district